Freedom Vahaakolo (born 18 July 1997) is a New Zealand rugby union player who plays for the  in Super Rugby. His playing position is wing. He was announced in the Highlanders side for Round 5 of the 2021 Super Rugby Aotearoa season. He has represented  in the National Provincial Championship (NPC) since 2020.

Reference list

External links
itsrugby.co.uk profile

1997 births
New Zealand rugby union players
Living people
Rugby union wings
Otago rugby union players
Highlanders (rugby union) players